The Hillsdale Daily News is a daily newspaper published in Hillsdale, Michigan, in the United States. It is owned by GateHouse Media.

The Daily News covers Hillsdale County, Michigan, including the city of Hillsdale and the cities and villages of Camden, Jonesville, Litchfield, Pittsford and Reading.

History 
Founded in the 1846 as the weekly Hillsdale Whig Standard, the newspaper dropped the name "Whig" in 1851 and converted to daily publication as the Hillsdale Daily Standard Herald, after absorbing its local competitor the Herald-Democrat, in 1909. From 1911 to 1915 it was called simply The Hillsdale Daily before adopting its current name.

The paper was formerly owned by Stauffer Communications, which was acquired by Morris Communications in 1994. Morris sold the paper, along with thirteen others, to GateHouse Media in 2007.

References

External links 
 
 GateHouse Media

Newspapers published in Michigan
Hillsdale, Michigan
Publications established in 1846
1846 establishments in Michigan
Gannett publications